Chiang Hsiao-wen (also known as Alan Chiang; 14 December 1935 – 14 April 1989) was the eldest son of Chiang Ching-kuo, the President of the Republic of China in Taiwan from 1978 to 1988. His mother is Faina Ipatyevna Vakhreva, also known as Chiang Fang-liang. He had one younger sister,  Hsiao-chang, and two younger brothers, Hsiao-wu and Hsiao-yung.  He had two half-brothers, Winston Chang and John Chiang, with whom he shared the same father.

He married Xu Nai Jin (Nancy) in 1960 and had a daughter, Yomei, in 1961. He suffered brain damage in 1970 while being treated for diabetes. He died of throat cancer on April 14, 1989.

References 

1935 births
1989 deaths
Chiang Kai-shek family
Taiwanese people of Belarusian descent
Soviet people of Chinese descent